Hampton is an area of Evesham in Worcestershire, England having formerly been a separate village. 

It is linked to the nearby town of Evesham by the ancient Hampton Ferry.

Hampton floods July 2007 
There was major flooding within Hampton in July 2007 in which most of village became isolated due to water covering all sides of the town. During this event many trucks and lorries were trapped within the village. This also happened to be the day in which the Hampton Spar reopened and nearly all the shop's supply of food was bought.

Villages in Worcestershire